Rocky & Hudson is a 1994 Brazilian animated film directed by Otto Guerra based on the Adão Iturrusgarai comic strip of the same name. Both characters are named after actor Rock Hudson. In 2020, the characters returned in a television series Rocky & Hudson: Os Caubóis Gays.

References

External links
 

1994 films
1994 animated films
Brazilian animated films
Brazilian LGBT-related films
Gay-related films
Films based on Brazilian comics
Films directed by Otto Guerra
Animated films based on comics
LGBT-related animated films
1994 LGBT-related films
1990s Portuguese-language films